Throughout its history, Haiti has suffered cyclones, hurricanes, tropical storms, torrential rains, floods and earthquakes.

The hurricane season in Haiti lasts from June to the end of November.

The following is a non-exhaustive list of natural disasters which have struck Haiti.

Disasters

 
 
1684 
 Earthquake
1691 
 Earthquake
1751
3 June: Earthquake at Port-au-Prince and areas to the south. The city and towns were destroyed.
1816
18–19 November: a cyclone caused considerable damage in the countryside of Ouest department and in the Gulf of Gonâve.
1842
7 May: Earthquake at Cap-Haïtien and throughout the north. The town of  Cap-Haïtien was destroyed along with the towns of Port-de-Paix, Gonaïves, and Fort-Liberté, and many towns in the Dominican Republic were affected.
1887
23 September: Earthquake in the western region of Haiti.
1904
Earthquake in the north of the country. Port-de-Paix and Cap-Haïtien were severely affected.
1909
12 November: cyclone in Ouest département. Around 150 victims were counted in plaine du Cul de Sac alone.
1915
12 August: cyclone on the southern peninsula, which devastated Jacmel and Jérémie.
1935
21 October: hurricane in Sud and Sud-Est départements.  people perished.
1946
Earthquake in the northeast Dominican Republic accompanied by a tsunami in the region of Nagua. Haiti was also affected.
1952
27 October: earthquake at Anse-à-Veau in Grand'Anse killed 6 and rendered thousands homeless.
1954
11–12 October: Hurricane Hazel affected every part of Haiti. At more than 249 km/h, the hurricane devastated the country, killing several thousand people.
1963
3 October: Hurricane Flora struck the Sud and Ouest départements, causing over  deaths.
14 November: flooding of the Grande Rivière du Nord killed almost 500 people.
1964
24 August: Hurricane Cleo hit the south coast, especially the Cayes-Jacmel region, causing 192 deaths.
1966
29 September: Hurricane Inez devastated, at more than 170 km/h, the Sud and Ouest départements
 Earthquake
1976 
20 May: Floods in the Cayes-Jacmel region. 20 people lost presumed dead, considerable property damage.
1980
5 August: Hurricane Allen, at more than 270 km/h, struck the south coast, especially the Cayes-Jacmel region, causing approximately 200 deaths.
 Atlantic hurricane season
1984 
10 June: floods at Port-de-Paix.
1986
1 June: Floods in the Cayes-Jacmel region.  hectares of land were flooded and several thousand homes damaged.
23 October: flooding at Ile de la Gonâve. 31 killed, 906 homeless, more than 380 houses destroyed or damaged.
1987
27 April: flooding at Port-de-Paix.
8 May: flooding at Thiotte in Sud-Est département and in the Delmas and Caradeux neighbourhoods of Port-au-Prince.
1988
27 January: flooding in the Nord-Ouest département.
20 June: flooding in L'Estère in the Artibonite département.
11 September: Hurricane Gilbert devastated the south coast, particularly the Anse-à-Veau, Camp-Perrin, Cavaillon, Cayes, Île à Vache, Jacmel, Jérémie, Kenscoff and Port-Salut regions.
8 October: flooding in the Plaine de Léogâne.
1989
23 February: flooding in Île de la Gonâve.  families affected,  houses destroyed and 1640 damaged.
1994
12 and 13 November: Hurricane Gordon crossed Sud-Est département and the southern peninsula, causing flooding and approximately 2,000 deaths and disappearances.
1998
23 September: Hurricane Georges devastated the Sud-Est and Nord-Ouest départements, causing 147 deaths, 34 serious injuries, 40 disappearances, and  displaced.
2002
24–27 May: Flooding on the southern peninsula. The town of Camp Perrin and the settlements of L'Asile and Anse-à-Veau were worst affected by the tropical storms. 31 dead, 14 disappeared and more than  displaced in the dans le Sud département.
2004
23–24 May: Torrential rains which pounded the south-east of Haiti during the night caused  deaths,  disappearances and  displaced persons.Mapou Belle-Anse with 432 dead, Bodary with 350 dead and Fonds-Verrettes with 237 victims, all located in Sud-Est département, were the places most badly hit. The gravity of this situation led the interim government of Boniface and Latortue to declare Friday 28 May a day of national mourning.
10 September: Hurricane Ivan struck the southern peninsula and west coast, causing serious damage in several areas due to flooding.
18–19 September: Hurricane Jeanne crossed the western section of Haiti and the Artibonite, causing flooding which killed . In addition:  injured, 846 disappeared and  displaced. With more than  dead, Gonaïves was the most seriously affected city.

2005
6 and 7 July: Hurricane Dennis touched the south-east coast of Haiti, causing flooding in several towns in Sud (Bainet, Grand-Goâve, Les Cayes...) and leaving more than 500 homeless.
4 October: Floods in several parts of the country, including Pétion-Ville and Grand-Goâve in Ouest département, where the high water caused considerable loss of property. The government did not make a final accounting of this catastrophe.
17–18 October: Hurricane Wilma struck the west and south of Haiti.
23 October: Tropical Storm Alpha crossed the south peninsula, affecting the départements of Grand'Anse and Nippes.
25 October: Flooding caused by torrential rain hit many parts of the Nord-Ouest département, particularly the settlements of Port-de-Paix, Bassin-Bleu, Anse-à-Foleur and Saint-Louis du Nord.
2006
22 and 23 November: heavy rain caused flooding in Grand'Anse, Nippes and Nord-Ouest départements, causing damage to roadways including the collapse of a bridge across Ravine Sable at Trou-Bonbon.

2007
17 March: floods caused by rain and storms hit a large part of Haiti for over a week. Six départements were particularly affected:
Grand'Anse: Jérémie, Abricots, Bonbon, Les Irois
Sud-Est : Jacmel
Ouest : Cité Soleil, Delmas, Port-au-Prince (Carrefour-Feuilles, Canapé Vert)
Nord-Ouest : Port-de-Paix, Saint-Louis du Nord, Anse-à-Foleur
Nord: Cap-Haïtien
Nord-Est : Ferrier, Ouanaminthe.
8–9 May: torrential rain, causing considerable damage in several regions of the country, in particular in the Nord, Nord-Est and Sud départements. The town of Ouanaminthe was particularly hard hit and the bridge between Ouanaminthe and Dajabón which links Haiti to the Dominican Republic was severely damaged.

2008
16 August: Tropical Storm Fay crossed the entire country.
26 August: Hurricane Gustav crosses the south peninsula, including the Sud and Grand'Anse départements, causing approximately 77 deaths and 8 disappearances, together with serious destruction of property.  families were affected by the storm, which destroyed  houses and damaged .
1 September: Hurricane Hanna ravaged the Artibonite and Nord-Est départements. Several towns were flooded, including Gonaïves. One death was officially confirmed. In addition to Gonaïves, several towns in Jacmel, Nord-Est, Sud and Sud-Est were flooded..
6 September: Hurricane Ike, a category 4 hurricane, grazed the western coastline of Haiti, leading to heavy rain in Nord, Ouest and Nord-Ouest départements.

2009
20 October: heavy rain in the Haitian capital and its suburbs. Carrefour, in the southern suburbs, was completely flooded.
2010
12 January: the magnitude 7.0 2010 Haiti earthquake which occurred on 12 at 16:53, local time. The earthquake killed between 100,000 and 316,000 people. Its epicentre was at approximately 25 km from Port-au-Prince, the capital. A dozen secondary shocks of magnitudes ranging from 5.0 to 5.9 were registered during the hours which followed. It was one of the deadliest earthquakes ever recorded. 
20 January: A second earthquake of magnitude 6.1 occurred on 20 January 2010 at 06:03 local time. Its epicentre was at approximately 59 km west of Port-au-Prince, and at least 10 km beneath the surface.
20 October: A Cholera epidemic hit outside of Port-au-Prince, killing at least 3,597 and sickening over 340,000.
5 November: Hurricane Tomas hits and kills at least 10 Haitians causing damage and worsening the cholera epidemic.
2012
 24 October: Hurricane Sandy passes just west of Haiti, delivering heavy rainfall and leaving some areas with catastrophic flooding. At least 108 people were killed and 21 were left missing. Around 200,000 people were left homeless as of October 29.
2016
 3–4 October: Hurricane Matthew hits Haiti with catastrophic flooding of up to 40 inches and storm surge of up to 10 feet. At least 580 people were killed and more than 35,000 left homeless by the storm.
2018
 6 October: A 5.9 magnitude earthquake with a depth of 11.7km occurred at 20:11 local time killing 12 people and injuring 188. Damage was mainly recorded in the far north of the island as stated by the Prime Minister Jean-Henry Céant.

2020

 23 August: Hurricane Laura  was a deadly and destructive Category 4 hurricane that was tied with the 1856 Last Island hurricane and it killed 31 people in Haiti and four in the Dominican Republic.

2021
 14 August: A magnitude 7.2 earthquake struck Southwestern Haiti. Its epicenter was about 10 km from Petit-Trou-de-Nippes, approximately 150 km (93 miles) west of Port-au-Prince, the capital. The quake left behind significant damage. Tsunami warnings were immediately issued as several small tsunami waves struck surrounding areas. An estimated 2,207 people have been confirmed dead, while 344 remain missing, and over 12,000 left injured. It is the strongest earthquake to strike Haiti since 1842.

References

External links
National Hurricane Center (US)

Natural disasters
 List
Haiti
Natural disasters